The Legion Like Women is a 1976 Spanish comedy film directed by Rafael Gil and starring Manolo Codeso, Luis Varela and Francisco Cecilio.  It is set during the Spanish Civil War.

Cast

References

External links 

1976 comedy films
Spanish comedy films
Films directed by Rafael Gil
Films set in Spain
Films set in the 1930s
Films scored by Gregorio García Segura
Films with screenplays by Rafael J. Salvia
1970s Spanish-language films
1970s Spanish films